László Marosi (born 26 November 1962 in Kisbér) is a Hungarian former handball player who currently works as a handball expert.

He participated at the 1988 Summer Olympics, where the Hungarian national team placed fourth, and at the 1992 Summer Olympics, where the team placed seventh. He also represented Hungary on two World Championships in 1986 and 1990 and won a silver medal on the first one.

Honours

National team
 World Championship:
 : 1986

Club
Tatabányai Bányász
Nemzeti Bajnokság I
: 1984
: 1982
: 1981
Magyar Kupa
: 1981, 1983 jan., 1984, 1988-89
: 1982

TBV Lemgo
Handball-Bundesliga
: 1997
DHB-Pokal
 : 1995, 1997
DHB-Supercup
 : 1997
EHF Cup Winners' Cup
 : 1996

Dunaferr SE
Nemzeti Bajnokság I
: 2000
EHF Cup Winners' Cup
 : 2000

Individual
 Hungarian Handballer of the Year: 1987, 1988
 Nemzeti Bajnokság I Top Scorer: 1984, 1985, 1986, 1987, 1989, 1990
 Best left back of the 1988 Olympic Games

References

1962 births
Living people
People from Kisbér
Handball-Bundesliga players with retired numbers
Hungarian male handball players
Olympic handball players of Hungary
Handball players at the 1988 Summer Olympics
Handball players at the 1992 Summer Olympics
Tatabánya KC
Sportspeople from Komárom-Esztergom County